Sitthikorn Klamsai (born July 24, 1996), is a Thai professional footballer who plays as a goalkeeper for Thai League 3 club Uthai Thani.

Honours

Club
Uthai Thani
Thai League 3 (1): 2021–22
Thai League 3 Northern Region (1): 2021–22

References
 

1996 births
Living people
Sitthikorn Klamsai
Association football goalkeepers
Sitthikorn Klamsai
Sitthikorn Klamsai
Sitthikorn Klamsai